The 2nd Daily Telegraph Trophy was a motor race, run to Formula One rules, held on 3 September 1955 at Aintree Circuit, Merseyside. The race was run over 17 laps, and was won by British driver Roy Salvadori in a Maserati 250F. Salvadori also set fastest lap, and  Stirling Moss was on pole position in a 250F but retired with engine problems. Bob Gerard was second in a Cooper T23-Bristol and Horace Gould third in another 250F.

This was the first race for the BRM P25. It only managed a few laps in practice before oil leaking onto the tyres caused driver Peter Collins to spin off and damage the car.

Results

References 

Daily Telegraph
Daily Telegraph